Sean Thomson (born January 28, 1985) is a Canadian lacrosse player who plays for the Minnesota Swarm in the National Lacrosse League. Thomson played one season for the Philadelphia Wings before being traded to the Swarm in 2010 for Kevin Colleluori.

Thomson was a member of the Peterborough Lakers during their 2007 Mann Cup championship season. While attending Guelph University, Thomson was a member of the Gryphons who won the 2008 Canadian University Field Lacrosse Association championship. Though he did not play for the Gryphons in 2008, he is expected to play in 2009. He was also named 2008 Burlington Male Athlete of the Year Award. Thomson also played lacrosse at Bellarmine University before transferring to Guelph.

National Lacrosse League career
Thomson was selected with the first round (ninth overall) in the 2008 NLL Entry Draft.  He made an immediate impact on the league, earning "Rookie of the Week" honors in Week 2 of the 2009 NLL season.

Statistics

NLL

References

1985 births
Living people
Bellarmine Knights men's lacrosse players
Canadian lacrosse players
Lacrosse people from Ontario
Minnesota Swarm players
Philadelphia Wings players
Sportspeople from Burlington, Ontario